Gregory Cochrane (born November 1, 1990) is an American former professional soccer player.

Career

Early career
Born in Babylon, New York, and moved to Holland, Pennsylvania, Cochrane attended Council Rock High School South in his hometown before attending Virginia Tech for which he played soccer for two seasons before joining the University of Louisville and playing for the Louisville Cardinals for two seasons as well.

Los Angeles Galaxy
Cochrane was selected in the second round of the 2013 MLS SuperDraft by the LA Galaxy. He made his professional debut for the Galaxy against FC Dallas at FC Dallas Stadium on April 13.

Chicago Fire
In March 2014, he was traded to the Chicago Fire in exchange for a conditional draft pick in the 2016 MLS SuperDraft

San Antonio FC
After Chicago declined to exercise their contract option for the 2016 season, Cochrane signed with USL club San Antonio FC on February 25, 2016. On September 29, 2018, Cochrane became the first player in San Antonio FC history to reach 100 appearances in all competitions.

On November 8, 2018, Cochrane announced his retirement from professional soccer.

Career statistics

References

External links 
 

1990 births
Living people
American soccer players
Virginia Tech Hokies men's soccer players
Louisville Cardinals men's soccer players
Central Jersey Spartans players
Reading United A.C. players
LA Galaxy players
Chicago Fire FC players
Saint Louis FC players
San Antonio FC players
Association football defenders
Soccer players from Pennsylvania
Sportspeople from Bucks County, Pennsylvania
LA Galaxy draft picks
USL League Two players
Major League Soccer players
People from Babylon, New York
USL Championship players